The following is a list of the MTV Europe Music Award Advanced and nominees for Best Asia Act.

2010s

2020s

Notes

References 

MTV Europe Music Awards
Awards established in 2012
Asian music awards